Church Street Historic District is a national historic district located at Batesburg-Leesville, Lexington County, South Carolina. It encompasses nine contributing buildings in a residential section of Leesville. They were largely constructed between about 1865 and 1909, with one house built after 1910.  The district includes the Gothic Revival style Leesville Methodist Church (1909) and notable Italianate and Queen Anne style residences.

It was listed on the National Register of Historic Places in 1982.

References

Historic districts on the National Register of Historic Places in South Carolina
Gothic Revival architecture in South Carolina
Italianate architecture in South Carolina
Queen Anne architecture in South Carolina
Buildings and structures in Lexington County, South Carolina
National Register of Historic Places in Lexington County, South Carolina